Catoptria siliciellus is a species of moth in the family Crambidae described by Hans Rebel in 18913. It is found in Bulgaria, Asia Minor, Iran (Larestan) and Transcaucasia.

The wingspan is 27–30 mm.

References

Crambini
Moths of Europe
Moths of Asia
Moths described in 1893